Ikenna Louis Obi (born 1976) is a Nigerian actor and film producer. He appeared in Shameful Deceit, for which he won Best Actor in a Supporting Role at the 5th BEFFTA UK Awards.

Early life
Obi was born on 27 of December 1976 in Lagos, the last of four children. His father became ill and died at a young age.

Career
Attended City Academy Drama School in London.

Filmography

Awards and nominations

References

External links 
 

Nigerian male stage actors
Nigerian male film actors
Living people
Nigerian bloggers
21st-century Nigerian male actors
Nigerian expatriates in the United Kingdom
1976 births
Male bloggers
Nigerian male television actors
Nigerian film producers
Igbo actors
Nigerian film award winners